Francis is a town in the province of Saskatchewan in Canada. The town is 67 km southeast of Regina and 50 km north of Weyburn at the intersection of Highway 33 and Highway 35.

Demographics 

See also 

 Francis (electoral district)
 List of communities in Saskatchewan
 Villages of Saskatchewan

References

Francis No. 127, Saskatchewan
Towns in Saskatchewan
Division No. 6, Saskatchewan